Beauchalot is a commune in the Haute-Garonne department in southwestern France. It is only about 50 minutes away from the Spanish border

Population

See also
Communes of the Haute-Garonne department

References

Communes of Haute-Garonne